Group E of the 2019 Africa Cup of Nations took place from 24 June to 2 July 2019. The group consisted of Angola, Mali, Mauritania and Tunisia.

Mali and Tunisia advanced to the round of 16.

Teams

Notes

Standings

In the round of 16:
 The winners of Group E, Mali advanced to play the runners-up of Group D, Ivory Coast.
 The runners-up of Group E, Tunisia, advanced to play the winners of Group F, Ghana.

Matches

Tunisia vs Angola

Mali vs Mauritania

Tunisia vs Mali

Mauritania vs Angola

Mauritania vs Tunisia

Angola vs Mali

References

External links
 

2019 Africa Cup of Nations